The Central District of Bavanat County is a district (bakhsh) in Bavanat County, Fars Province, Iran. At the 2006 census, its population was 25,136, in 6,773 families.  The District has two cities: Surian & Mazayjan. The District has four rural districts (dehestan): Baghestan Rural District, Mazayjan Rural District, Sarvestan Rural District, and Simakan Rural District.

References 

Bavanat County
Districts of Fars Province